Cassandra  Peterson (born September 17, 1951) is an American actress. She is best known for her portrayal of the horror hostess character Elvira, Mistress of the Dark. Peterson gained fame on Los Angeles television station KHJ-TV in her stage persona as Elvira, hosting Elvira's Movie Macabre, a weekly B movie presentation. A member of the Los Angeles-based improvisational and sketch comedy troupe The Groundlings, Peterson based her Elvira persona in part on a "Valley girl"-type character she created while a member of the troupe.

The popularity of Elvira's Movie Macabre led to the 1988 film Elvira: Mistress of the Dark, and later the 2001 film Elvira's Haunted Hills, both starring Peterson as Elvira. The television show was revived in 2010, featuring Elvira hosting public domain films, and airing on This TV until 2011. Elvira returned as a horror hostess in 2014 with 13 Nights of Elvira, a 13-episode series produced by Hulu, and again in 2021 for a one-night 40th Anniversary Special that aired on Shudder.

Peterson has made cameo appearances as Elvira in a number of films and television programs, including appearing as a guest commentator during WrestleMania 2 and as a guest judge on RuPaul's Drag Race, The Boulet Brothers' Dragula, and Halloween Wars.

Early life
Peterson was born in Manhattan, Kansas. When she was a toddler, she was scalded by boiling water, which required skin grafts to cover over 35% of her body to heal, resulting in her having to spend three months in the hospital. However, in her interview on the podcast Inside of You hosted by actor Michael Rosenbaum, Peterson stated that her scars were the result of a fire.

In a 2011 interview, Peterson stated that as a child, she was more fascinated by horror-themed toys while other girls were occupied with Barbie dolls. In elementary school, she watched House on Haunted Hill, which was the first horror film she ever saw. During her teens, Peterson worked as a drag queen go-go dancer in a Colorado Springs, Colorado gay bar and as a go-go dancer for soldiers at Fort Carson.

Career

Early career
Inspired by Ann-Margret in the film Viva Las Vegas, while on a trip to Las Vegas, Nevada, during high school, she convinced her parents to let her see a live show where she was noticed by the production staff; despite being only 17 years old, she convinced her parents to let her sign a contract. Immediately after graduating high school, she drove back to Las Vegas, where she became a showgirl in Frederic Apcar's pioneering "Vive Les Girls!" at The Dunes; there, she met Elvis Presley, with whom she went on a date. She had a small role as a showgirl in the James Bond film Diamonds Are Forever (1971) and played a topless dancer in the film The Working Girls (1974). Peterson says that while she has no memory of the event, she appears to have posed for the cover of Tom Waits' album Small Change (1976).

In the early 1970s, Peterson moved to Italy and became lead singer of the Italian rock bands I Latins 80 and The Snails. After being introduced to film director Federico Fellini by the producer of a documentary on Las Vegas showgirls in which she had appeared, she landed a small part in the film Roma (1972). When she returned to the United States, she toured nightclubs and discos around the country with a musical/comedy act,
Mamma's Boys.

In her 2021 memoir Yours Cruelly, Elvira, she writes, "Perhaps the biggest mistake I made in my twenties was posing nude for a husband-and-wife photography team, who bullshitted me into doing what they said was a 'test shoot' for Penthouse magazine.  They guaranteed me it would never be seen anywhere publicly." She adds, "I never saw or heard from them again, and as far as I knew, that was the end of that - until 1981 when I became famous. Those photos, pubic hair and all, appeared in every sleazy men's magazine on the stand and there wasn't a damn thing I could do about it." 

In 1979, she joined the Los Angeles-based improvisational troupe The Groundlings, where she created a Valley girl-type character upon whom the Elvira persona is largely based.

Peterson was one of two finalists for the role of Ginger Grant for the third Gilligan's Island television movie in 1981, but was dropped before filming. Shortly after that, KHJ-TV offered her the horror host position. Peterson also was a personality on Los Angeles radio station KROQ-FM 106.7 from 1982 to 1983.

Elvira

Elvira begins: Movie Macabre

In 1981, six years after the death of Larry Vincent, who starred as host Sinister Seymour of a Los Angeles weekend horror show called Fright Night, show producers began to bring the show back.

The producers decided to use a hostess. They asked 1950s' horror hostess Maila Nurmi to revive The Vampira Show. Nurmi worked on the project for a short time, but quit when the producers would not hire Lola Falana to play Vampira. The station sent out a casting call, and Peterson auditioned and won the role. Producers left it up to her to create the role's image. She and her best friend, Robert Redding, came up with the sexy punk/vampire look after producers rejected her original idea to look like Sharon Tate's character in The Fearless Vampire Killers.

Shortly before the first taping, producers received a cease and desist letter from Nurmi. Besides the similarities in the format and costumes, Elvira's closing line for each show, wishing her audience "Unpleasant dreams", was notably similar to Vampira's closer: "Bad dreams, darlings..." uttered as she walked off down a misty corridor. The court ruled in favor of Peterson, holding that "'likeness' means actual representation of another person's appearance, and not simply close resemblance." Peterson claimed that Elvira was nothing like Vampira aside from the basic design of the black dress and black hair. Nurmi claimed that Vampira's image was based on Morticia Addams, a character in Charles Addams's cartoons that appeared in The New Yorker magazine.

Peterson's Elvira character rapidly gained notice with her tight-fitting, low-cut, cleavage-displaying black gown. Adopting the flippant tone of a California "Valley girl", she brought a satirical, sarcastic edge to her commentary. She reveled in dropping risqué double entendres and making frequent jokes about her cleavage. In an AOL Entertainment News interview, Peterson said, "I figured out that Elvira is me when I was a teenager. She's a spastic girl. I just say what I feel and people seem to enjoy it." Her camp humor, sex appeal, and good-natured self-mockery made her popular with late-night movie viewers and her popularity soared.

The Elvira character soon evolved from an obscure cult figure to a lucrative brand. She was associated with many products through the 1980s and 1990s, including Halloween costumes, comic books, action figures, trading cards, pinball machines, Halloween decor, model kits, calendars, perfume and dolls. She has appeared on the cover of Femme Fatales magazine five times. Her popularity reached its zenith with the release of the 1988 feature film Elvira: Mistress of the Dark, on whose script, written directly for the screen, Peterson collaborated with John Paragon and Sam Egan.

After several years of attempts to make a sequel to Elvira: Mistress of the Dark, Cassandra and her manager and then-husband Mark Pierson decided to finance a second movie. In November 2000, Peterson wrote, again in collaboration with Paragon, and co-produced Elvira's Haunted Hills. The film was shot in Romania for just under one million dollars. With little budget left for promotion, Cassandra and Mark screened the film at AIDS charity fund raisers across America. For many people in attendance, this was their first opportunity to see the woman behind the Elvira character. On July 5, 2002, Elvira's Haunted Hills had its official premiere in Hollywood. Elvira arrived at the premiere in her Macabre Mobile. The film was later screened at the 2003 Cannes Film Festival.

In September 2010, Elvira's Movie Macabre returned to television syndication, this time with public domain films. In October 2014, it was revealed that a new series of thirteen episodes had been produced, 13 Nights of Elvira for Hulu. The show premiered on October 19, 2014, running through to Halloween.

As of September 2018, Peterson was working to develop a direct sequel to 1988's Elvira: Mistress of the Dark, as well as an animated Elvira project.

Elvira on home video
In 1985, Elvira began hosting a home video series called ThrillerVideo, a division of International Video Entertainment (IVE). Many of these films were hand-selected by Peterson. Choosing to stay away from the more explicit cannibal, slasher and zombie films of the time, these were generally tamer films such as The Monster Club and Dan Curtis television films, as well as many episodes of the Hammer House of Horror television series. Since she had refused to host Make Them Die Slowly, Seven Doors of Death, and Buried Alive, however, the videos were released on the ThrillerVideo label without Elvira's appearance as hostess. After this, several extended episodes of the British namesake series Thriller (i.e. The Devil's Web, A Killer in Every Corner, Murder Motel) were also released without an appearance by Elvira; in some, such as Buried Alive, the cast replaced her.

The success of the ThrillerVideo series led to a second video set, Elvira's Midnight Madness, released through Rhino Home Video. In 2004 a DVD horror-film collection called Elvira's Box of Horrors was released, marking Elvira's return to horror-movie hostessing after a ten-year absence.

Unaired pilot for The Elvira Show on CBS
In 1993, she filmed a pilot for CBS called The Elvira Show. An expansion of the 1988 film with a sitcom setting, the premise had Elvira and her family moving into a new neighborhood with her older aunt and dealing with nosy neighbors and uptight conservatives who all want them to move out. It also starred Katherine Helmond, Phoebe Augustine, Cristine Rose, Ted Henning, Lynne Marie Stewart, Claudette Wells, John Paragon, Laurie Faso, and Basil Hoffman. It was not picked up by a TV network.

Non-Elvira career
Peterson has also portrayed non-Elvira roles in many other films, most notably Pee-wee's Big Adventure in 1985 alongside friend and fellow Groundling Paul Reubens, who starred as his Pee-wee Herman character; Allan Quatermain and the Lost City of Gold, released in 1987, which starred Richard Chamberlain and Sharon Stone; and All About Evil, as a mother named Linda, who says not to go to the old theater to watch scary movies.

Rob Zombie confirmed Peterson to appear in his The Munsters movie.

Personal life
Peterson married musician Mark Pierson in 1981, and he soon became her personal manager. They had one daughter, Sadie Pierson (born October 12, 1994), and were divorced on February 14, 2003.

Peterson released her memoir, Yours Cruelly, Elvira: Memoirs of the Mistress of the Dark, on September 21, 2021. She revealed in the book that she has been in a relationship with a woman, Teresa "T" Wierson, since 2002. They began their romantic relationship following Peterson's separation from her husband. In the book, she also accused basketball player Wilt Chamberlain of sexually assaulting her during a party at his Bel Air mansion in the 1970s.

Peterson was a vegetarian for many years; as of 2021, she continues to maintain a "mostly vegetarian" diet.

Filmography

Music video appearances

Discography
Peterson recorded several songs and skits for her Elvira Halloween albums in the 1980s and 1990s:

 Elvira and the Vi-Tones: 3-D TV: "3-D TV (Three-Dimensional)" b/w "Elvira's Theme" (Rhino Records 1982)
 Elvira Presents Vinyl Macabre: Oldies but Ghoulies (Volume 1) (Rhino Records 1983)
 Elvira Presents Haunted Hits (Rhino Records 1987)
 Elvira Presents Monster Hits (Rhino Records 1994)
 Elvira Presents Revenge of the Monster Hits (Rhino Records 1995)
 Elvira's Gravest Hits (Shout! Factory 2010)

She also performed on a track called "Zombie Killer" for the band Leslie and the LY's, released in February 2008. The music video for the track features Leslie and the LY's performing to a sold-out audience of zombies in a fictional venue called "Elvira Stadium". A 7" single was released.

Bibliography

Awards and nominations

Awards
Los Angeles Silver Lake Film Festival
Spirit of Silver Lake Award: 2001
Hollywood Horror Festival
Vincent Price Award: 2018

Nominations
Saturn Awards
Best Actress: 1988

Raspberry Awards
Worst Actress: 1988

See also
 Midnight movie

Footnotes

External links

 
 
 
 Full text of court decision in Nurmi v. Peterson
 SWINDLE magazine interview with Cassandra Peterson
 KCRW Guest DJ set 
 TheRealElvira on Mastodon

1951 births
20th-century American actresses
21st-century American actresses
Actresses from Colorado
Actresses from Colorado Springs, Colorado
Actresses from Kansas
American female dancers
American film actresses
American television actresses
American television personalities
American voice actresses
American women television personalities
American women comedians
Dancers from Kansas
Elvira, Mistress of the Dark
Horror hosts
LGBT actresses
American LGBT actors
LGBT people from Colorado
LGBT people from Kansas
American LGBT rights activists
Living people
People from Manhattan, Kansas